Eooxylides meduana is a butterfly in the family Lycaenidae. It was described by William Chapman Hewitson in 1869. It is found in the Philippines (Mindanao, Bohol, Panaon).

References

Further reading
, 1986. Butterflies of the Oriental Region, Part III Lycaenidae & Riodinidae: pp. 536–672. Melbourne.
, 1912. Ubersicht der Lycaeniden des Indo-Australischen Gebiets. Begründet auf die Ausbeute und die Sammlung des . Berliner Entomologische Zeitschrift 56(3/4): 197-272, 4 figs.
, 1863–1878. Illustrations of diurnal Lepidoptera, Lycaenidae. London, van Vorst, x + 229 pp. Text Plates.
, 1974. Butterflies of the World xvi + 104pp., 208 pls. Harrap, London.

, 1995. Checklist of the butterflies of the Philippine Islands (Lepidoptera: Rhopalocera) Nachrichten des Entomologischen Vereins Apollo Suppl. 14: 7–118.
 & , 2012. Revised checklist of the butterflies of the Philippine Islands (Lepidoptera: Rhopalocera). Nachrichten des Entomologischen Vereins Apollo 32 Suppl. 20, 64pp.

Eooxylides
Butterflies described in 1869
Butterflies of Asia
Taxa named by William Chapman Hewitson